This is a list of non-rectangular flags, including the flags of states or territories, groups or movements, and individual people.

List

Current flags

Sovereign states

Sub-national territories

Private entities

Former flags

References 

non-rectangular flags
non-rectangular flags